Inverness Caledonian Thistle F.C. in their sixth season in the Scottish Football League competed in the Scottish First Division, Scottish League Cup, the Scottish Challenge Cup, the Scottish Challenge Cup where they made their first major final against Second Division team Alloa Athletic where they lost on a penalty shoot-out after a 4–4 draw and Scottish Cup where they famously beat Scottish Premier League team Celtic 3–1 in the 3rd Round in season 1999–2000.

Results

Scottish First Division

Final League table

Scottish League Cup

Scottish Challenge Cup

Scottish Cup

Hat-tricks

References
caleythistleonline

Inverness Caledonian Thistle F.C. seasons
Inverness Caledonian Thistle